In baseball statistics, a double play (denoted as DP) is the act of making two outs during the same continuous play. One double play is recorded for every defensive player who participates in the play, regardless of how many of the outs in which they were directly involved, and is counted in addition to whatever putouts and assists might also apply. Double plays can occur any time there is at least one baserunner and fewer than two outs. The catcher is a defensive position for a baseball or softball player. When a batter takes his/her turn to hit, the catcher crouches behind home plate, in front of the (home) umpire, and receives the ball from the pitcher. In addition to these primary duties, the catcher is also called upon to master many other skills to field the position well. The role of the catcher is similar to that of the wicket-keeper in cricket. In the numbering system used to record defensive plays, the catcher is assigned the number 2.

Catchers typically record double plays by throwing out a runner attempting to steal a base immediately after the batter has struck out, by tagging out a runner attempting to score a run after receiving a throw from an outfielder on an attempted sacrifice fly, by stepping on home plate to force out a runner with the bases loaded and then throwing out another runner (often the batter trying to reach first base), or by tagging out a runner attempting to score after an out has been recorded at another base. Double plays are also occasionally recorded when a rundown play is involved, almost always as the second out. On August 2, 1985, Carlton Fisk of the Chicago White Sox recorded a double play by tagging out two New York Yankees moments apart at home plate when both tried to score on a double. The feat was duplicated by Paul Lo Duca of the New York Mets in Game 1 of the 2006 National League Division Series against the Los Angeles Dodgers.

Many of the career leaders were active during baseball's dead-ball era when runners made more aggressive attempts to advance around the bases in risky situations; 13 of the top 18 single-season totals, and 28 of the top 37, were recorded before 1928. Ray Schalk holds the record for the most career double plays by a catcher with 222. Steve O'Neill is second with 198; only seven other catchers have recorded 150 career double plays.

Key

List

Stats updated through the 2022 season

Other Hall of Famers

Notes

References

External links

Major League Baseball statistics
Double plays as a catcher